1967 in Korea may refer to:
1967 in North Korea
1967 in South Korea